Kneeland may refer to:

Places
United States
Kneeland, California
Kneeland, Michigan
Kneeland, Wisconsin
Kneeland Airport
Kneeland Elementary School District

Court case
Commonwealth v. Kneeland, court case

People
Abner Kneeland (1774-1844), American evangelist and theologian
David Kneeland (1881-1948), American athlete
Francis M. Kneeland (born 1873), African American physician 
Hildegarde Kneeland (1889–1994), American economist and statistician
Kneeland Youngblood (1955- ), American surgeon and political figure